Ten Union Railroad 0-10-2 steam locomotives were built in 1936–1939 by the Baldwin Locomotive Works.  These were the only 0-10-2 locomotives ever built in the United States and this purchase gave the name "Union" to this type.

The Union Railroad was a switching and transfer line owned by U.S. Steel, serving a number of plants in the area and connecting with six trunk line railroads.  Operation was only at low speed, thus a leading truck's stability was not required.  The intent was to eliminate helper requirements on grades, and thus a locomotive larger than the Union's previous switchers and 2-8-0 "Consolidations" was needed.  Ten driving wheels allowed the application of sufficient tractive effort within the axle load limits of the line, and the requirement for a large firebox and plentiful steam-raising ability necessitated the trailing truck.   To increase tractive effort still further, a booster engine was fitted to the leading tender truck.  The unusual wheel arrangement was also a result of the turntable restrictions on the total wheel base.

Upon dieselization of the Union in 1949, nine of the locomotives were sold to fellow U.S. Steel railroad the Duluth, Missabe and Iron Range, where they served until 1962.  One of these locomotives survives as a static exhibit at Greenville, Pennsylvania.

References

Steam locomotives of the United States
Baldwin locomotives
0-10-2 locomotives
Freight locomotives